The Oldham Titans Basketball Club is the largest recreational Basketball Club in Oldham and Greater Manchester, England.

The team is for Men (open age)

The Men's Team.

The Men's Team has evolved from the former Saddleworth/Salem Basketball Team that has traditionally competed in the Manchester Area Basketball League for over 15 years.

The 2004-2005 season brought promotion to Division One of the league.

The team finished mid-table in the 2005-2006 season.

External links
 Oldham Titans Basketball Club
Oldham Titans has recently evolved under new ownership (Mark Hamilton) who has progressed the club further so that all youth ages (U13-U18) are all competing at national league standard. As of the 2011-2012 season Mark has set up a new men's league that will compete in the northern national league conference.

Image
 Oldham Titans Basketball Club logo

Sport in Oldham
Basketball teams in England